The following outline is provided as an overview of and topical guide to Norfolk Island:

The Australian Territory of Norfolk Island comprises Norfolk Island and two uninhabited neighboring islands located in the South Pacific Ocean amidst Australia, New Zealand and New Caledonia.  Norfolk Island is one of Australia's external territories.

The Norfolk Island Pine, a symbol of the island pictured in its flag, is an evergreen tree native to the island.

General reference 

 Pronunciation:
 Common English country name:  Norfolk Island
 Official English country name:  The Australian Territory of Norfolk Island
 Common endonym(s): Norf'k Ailen 
 Official endonym(s):  
 Adjectival(s): Norfolk Island
 Demonym(s): Norfolk Islander
 Etymology
 ISO country codes:  NF, NFK, 574
 ISO region codes:  See ISO 3166-2:NF
 Internet country code top-level domain:  .nf

Geography of Norfolk Island 

Geography of Norfolk Island
 Norfolk Island is: an island and an external territory of Australia
 Location:
 Southern Hemisphere and Eastern Hemisphere
 Pacific Ocean
 South Pacific
 Oceania
 Australasia
 Time zone:  UTC+11:30
 Extreme points of Norfolk Island
 High:  Mount Bates 
 Low:  South Pacific Ocean 0 m
 Land boundaries:  none
 Coastline:  South Pacific Ocean 32 km
 Area of Norfolk Island: 34 km2
 Atlas of Norfolk Island

Environment of Norfolk Island 

 Climate of Norfolk Island
 Renewable energy in Norfolk Island
 Geology of Norfolk Island
 Protected areas of Norfolk Island
 Biosphere reserves in Norfolk Island
 National parks of Norfolk Island
 Wildlife of Norfolk Island
 Fauna of Norfolk Island
 Birds of Norfolk Island
 Mammals of Norfolk Island

Natural geographic features of Norfolk Island 

 Fjords of Norfolk Island
 Glaciers of Norfolk Island
 Islands of Norfolk Island
 Lakes of Norfolk Island
 Mountains of Norfolk Island
 Volcanoes in Norfolk Island
 Rivers of Norfolk Island
 Waterfalls of Norfolk Island
 Valleys of Norfolk Island
 World Heritage Sites in Norfolk Island: None

Regions of Norfolk Island 

Regions of Norfolk Island

Ecoregions of Norfolk Island 

List of ecoregions in Norfolk Island
 Ecoregions in Norfolk Island

Administrative divisions of Norfolk Island 
None

Municipalities of Norfolk Island 

 Capital of Norfolk Island: Kingston
 Cities of Norfolk Island

Demography of Norfolk Island 

Demographics of Norfolk Island

Government and politics of Norfolk Island 

Politics of Norfolk Island
 Form of government:
 Capital of Norfolk Island: Kingston
 Elections in Norfolk Island
 Political parties in Norfolk Island

Branches of the government of Norfolk Island 

Government of Norfolk Island

Executive branch of the government of Norfolk Island 
 Head of state: Administrator of Norfolk Island appointed by and responsible to the Governor-General of Australia
 Head of government: Chief Minister of Norfolk Island,
 Cabinet of Norfolk Island

Legislative branch of the government of Norfolk Island 

 Parliament of Norfolk Island: Norfolk Legislative Assembly
 Norfolk Island Regional Council

Judicial branch of the government of Norfolk Island 

Court system of Norfolk Island
 Supreme Court of Norfolk Island

Foreign relations of Norfolk Island 

Foreign relations of Norfolk Island
 Diplomatic missions in Norfolk Island
 Diplomatic missions of Norfolk Island

International organisation membership 
The Australian Territory of Norfolk Island is a member of:
Universal Postal Union (UPU)

Law and order in Norfolk Island 

Law of Norfolk Island
 Constitution of Norfolk Island
 Crime in Norfolk Island
 Human rights in Norfolk Island
 LGBT rights in Norfolk Island
 Freedom of religion in Norfolk Island
 Law enforcement in Norfolk Island

Military of Norfolk Island 

Military of Norfolk Island
 Command
 Commander-in-chief:
 Ministry of Defence of Norfolk Island
 Forces
 Army of Norfolk Island
 Navy of Norfolk Island
 Air Force of Norfolk Island
 Special forces of Norfolk Island
 Military history of Norfolk Island
 Military ranks of Norfolk Island

Local government in Norfolk Island 

Local government in Norfolk Island

History of Norfolk Island 

History of Norfolk Island
Timeline of the history of Norfolk Island
Current events of Norfolk Island
 Military history of Norfolk Island

Culture of Norfolk Island 

Culture of Norfolk Island
 Architecture of Norfolk Island
 Cuisine of Norfolk Island
 Festivals in Norfolk Island
 Languages of Norfolk Island
 Media in Norfolk Island
 List of newspapers in Norfolk Island
 National symbols of Norfolk Island
 Coat of arms of Norfolk Island
 Flag of Norfolk Island
 National anthem of Norfolk Island:
 God Save the Queen, the official anthem
 Pitcairn Anthem, the unofficial anthem
 People of Norfolk Island
 Public holidays in Norfolk Island
 Records of Norfolk Island
 Religion in Norfolk Island
 Bahá‘í Faith in Norfolk Island
 Buddhism in Norfolk Island
 Christianity in Norfolk Island
 Falun Gong in Norfolk Island
 Hinduism in Norfolk Island
 Irreligion in Norfolk Island
 Islam in Norfolk Island
 Judaism in Norfolk Island
 Sikhism in Norfolk Island
 World Heritage Sites in Norfolk Island: None

Art in Norfolk Island 
 Art in Norfolk Island
 Cinema of Norfolk Island
 Literature of Norfolk Island
 Music of Norfolk Island
 Television in Norfolk Island
 Theatre in Norfolk Island

Sports in Norfolk Island 
 Sports in Norfolk Island
 Athletics in Norfolk Island
 Australian rules football in Norfolk Island
 Baseball in Norfolk Island
 Basketball in Norfolk Island
 Cricket in Norfolk Island
 E-sports in Norfolk Island
 Lawn bowls in Norfolk Island
 Mountain biking in Norfolk Island
 Rugby league in Norfolk Island
 Rugby union in Norfolk Island
 Soccer in Norfolk Island
 Surfing in Norfolk Island
 Swimming in Norfolk Island
 Norfolk Island at the Commonwealth Games
 Norfolk Island at the Olympics

Economy and infrastructure of Norfolk Island 

Economy of Norfolk Island
 Economic rank, by nominal GDP (2007):
 Agriculture in Norfolk Island
 Banking in Norfolk Island
 National Bank of Norfolk Island
 Communications in Norfolk Island
 Internet in Norfolk Island
 Companies of Norfolk Island
Currency of Norfolk Island: Dollar
ISO 4217: AUD
 Energy in Norfolk Island
 Energy policy of Norfolk Island
 Oil industry in Norfolk Island
 Mining in Norfolk Island
 Tourism in Norfolk Island
 Transport in Norfolk Island
 Norfolk Island Stock Exchange

Education in Norfolk Island 

Education in Norfolk Island

Infrastructure of Norfolk Island
 Health care in Norfolk Island
 Transportation on Norfolk Island
 Airports in Norfolk Island
 Rail transport in Norfolk Island
 Roads in Norfolk Island
 Water supply and sanitation in Norfolk Island

See also 

Norfolk Island
Index of Norfolk Island-related articles
List of international rankings
List of Norfolk Island-related topics
Outline of Australia
Outline of geography
Outline of Oceania

References

External links 

Norfolk Island